Popatopolis is a 2009 documentary film directed by Clay Westervelt about the making of Jim Wynorski's soft-core horror film, The Witches of Breastwick.

The documentary features B-Movie icons Roger Corman, Andy Sidaris, Julie Strain, Julie K. Smith, Stormy Daniels, and more.

Jim Wynorski later said, "A director spent five years making this documentary about me. It was very flattering during the production period, but I was a bit worried how it might turn out. In the end, I found it very funny – even if it does take an occasional stab at me."

Plot
The documentary follows American director, Jim Wynorski, in his attempt to make a film in three days. By cutting shooting schedule, crew, equipment, and food, Wynorski tries to eliminate any unnecessary limitations that would slow down production.

The film also portrays a biographical account of Jim Wynorski as a filmmaker while it presses on several issues regarding the evolution of the B-movie industry.

Cast
Jim Wynorski as himself
Julie K. Smith as herself
Julie Strain as herself
Monique Parent as herself
Stormy Daniels as herself
Antonia Dorian as herself
Roger Corman as himself
Andy Sidaris as himself
Joe Souza as himself

References

Cinesploitation - Popatopolis Review
Horror Society - Popatopolis
Popatopolis Review
Reviews
Moviefone Review
Film Journal Review
Video Graveyard Review

External links

Interview with Jim Wynorski
Raindance Film Festival Interview
Podcast names Popatopolis Netflix instant Winner of the week

2009 documentary films
2009 films
American documentary films
Documentary films about films
Documentary films about horror
2000s English-language films
2000s American films